The International Trot is a harness racing event held in the New York City area that aimed to appeal to a mix of United States and international entrants. The inaugural event was held at Roosevelt Raceway in Westbury, New York in 1959, and was held at the track until its closure in 1988. Thereafter, the race moved to Yonkers Raceway in Yonkers, New York.

In advance of its third running in 1961, The New York Times described that "There are many harness racing stakes that are older and quite a few that are richer, but there is none, that for glamour, pageantry, excitement and wild wagering matches the Roosevelt International Trot."

Yonkers Raceway announced in 2014 that they would return the International Trot to the racing schedule after a hiatus of almost 20 years. With a purse of $1 million, the 2015 International Trot was won by Papagayo E, giving Norway their first win in the race.

The International Trot was not held in 2020 or 2021 due to travel restrictions imposed as a result of the COVID-19 pandemic.

Race history

1959
In 1959, a trotter from France named Jamin was scheduled to run in the inaugural International Trot at Roosevelt Raceway. The track's publicist, Joe Goldstein spread the word that the horse's chances were affected by the loss of over 150 pounds of artichokes that had been impounded, and then misplaced, by the United States Department of Agriculture at Idlewild Airport. Goldstein placed ads in The New York Times and New York Herald Tribune that read "French Trotter Needs Artichokes. Can You Help?", including a phone number of Roosevelt Raceway. Newspapers gave the story extensive play, with locals bring their backyard-grown artichokes to the track and United Airlines flying artichokes in from Watsonville, California, the artichoke capital of America. The horse was energized after eating the artichokes, or so Goldstein said, and went on to win the race in front of a crowd of 45,000. Jamin held on to win in front of a crowd of 48,000 spectators, with the Italian horse Tornese in second by half a length and betting favorite Trader Horn, an American entry, in third, 2¼ lengths out of second. Jamin ran the mile-and-a-half in 3:08.6.

1960
Both first-time champion Jamin and Ruder Konge of Denmark dropped out of the 1960 race. The 9-year old Hairos II, driven by Willem Geersen, went on to win the mile-and-a-quarter second running in a field of seven in a time of 2:34, defeating the Italian horse Crevalcore by a half-length, with the American entry Silver Song, a 9-5 favorite, in third by a half-length behind Crevalcore. The crowd of 54,861 set a record, breaking the prior mark of 50,337 set at the track in August 1957.

1961
Hairos II was unable to defend his title in the 1961 race, after suffering a bowed tendon during a win in a race in The Hague. At the 1961 International Trot, a French horse named Kracovie that had won that year's European circuit was missing a stablemate, either a mountain sheep or a goat, that could not be brought into the United States due to quarantine regulations, and would not eat in the absence of its companion. As described by George Vecsey in the Times, "The entertainer Tina Louise just happened to have a goat in her Manhattan apartment. Wearing a low-cut dress, she and her agent and the goat paid a mission of mercy to Roosevelt." Despite the publicity, and the goat, Kracovie lost the race to Su Mac Lad, with Tie Silk in third. Su Mac Lad, driven by Stanley Dancer, finished in a time of 2:34.4 in driving rain and a sloppy track in front of 28,105 racing fans.

1962
The lightly regarded Canadian horse Tie Silk, who had finished in third the previous year and sixth the year before, won the $50,000 race in front of a crowd of 53,279. Six-year-old Tie Silk, driven by Keith Waples, won in a time of 2:34.2, with favorite and returning winner Su Mac Lad in second and world record holder Porterhouse in third. The betting handle of $2,793,596 set a world record for a harness racing program, breaking the prior record set at the second running of the International Trot.

1963
Su Mac Lad, who had won in 1961 but dropped to second in 1962, returned to win the 1963 running in a seven-horse field, before a crowd of 41,197 of what The New York Times called "screaming harness racing buffs". The Dutch horse Martini II came in second, with returning champion Tie Silk in third. Driven by Stanley Dancer, Su Mac Lad paid bettors $2.90 to win in tying a world record at the 1¼-mile distance with a time of 2:32.6. The 9-to-20 favorite came in a half-length ahead of Martini II who in turn beat Tie Silk by 7.5 lengths. The $25,000 taken home by Su Mac Lad brought his career winnings to $687,549, the most of any pacer or trotter as of that date.

1988
After the demise of Roosevelt Raceway in 1988, the race was relocated to Yonkers Raceway. Mack Lobell won the first Yonkers edition of the race in a track record time of 2:30 4/5.

Locations
Roosevelt Raceway (1959-1988)
Yonkers Raceway (1988-1993, 1995, 2015–present)

Historical race events
The inaugural race of 1959 was run at a distance of  miles after which it was set at its current  miles.

In 1983, France's Ideal du Gazeau became the only horse to ever win the International Trot three times.

Lutin d'Isigny, another French horse, won the 1984 race in a then World Record time of 2:31 flat. His winning margin of 7 lengths was the largest in the 26-year history of the event.

On October 25, 2014, Yonkers Raceway ran the International Trot Preview, a precursor to the return of the International Trot in 2015. The race was won by Natural Herbie for owner/trainer/driver Verlin Yoder.

Wins by country
The winners of the International Trot have come from 8 different countries.
United States: 15
France: 13
Sweden: 3
Canada: 3
Italy: 3
Norway: 2
Denmark: 1
Netherlands: 1

Records
 Most wins by a horse
 3 – Ideal du Gazeau (1981, 1982, 1983)

 Most wins by a driver
 3 – Jean-René Gougeon (1968, 1969, 1971) 
 3 – Eugène Lefèvre (1981, 1982, 1983)

 Most wins by a trainer
 3 – Jean-René Gougeon (1968, 1969, 1971) 
 3 – Eugène Lefèvre (1981, 1982, 1983)

 Stakes record (1 ¼ miles)
 2:30 0/0 – Lutin d'Isigny (1984) at Roosevelt
 2:22 1/5 – Twister Bi (2017) at Yonkers

International Trot winners

External links
YouTube video of Jamin winning the 1959 inaugural International Trot

References

Harness races in the United States
Horse races in New York (state)
Recurring events established in 1959
1959 establishments in New York (state)
Sports in Yonkers, New York